Hemimyzon pumilicorpora is a species of ray-finned fish in the genus Hemimyzon.  it is a fresh water fish found in China.  Males can reach up to 5.7 cm in length.

Footnotes 
 

Hemimyzon
Fish described in 1987